Minerve was a 40-gun  of the French Navy. The British captured her twice and the French recaptured her once. She therefore served under four names before being broken up in 1814:
 Minerve, 1794–1795
 HMS Minerve, 1795–1803
 Canonnière, 1803–1810
 HMS Confiance, 1810–1814

French service as Minerve

Her keel was laid in January 1792, and Minerve was launched in 1794. On 14 December, off the island of Ivica, she captured the collier Hannibal, which was sailing from Liverpool to Naples. However, eleven days later,  recaptured Hannibal off Toulon and sent her into Corsica.

Minerve took part in combat off Noli. Minerve surrendered to the British, Artémise having fled, and was commissioned in the Royal Navy as HMS Minerve.

British service as HMS Minerve

French Revolutionary Wars
On 19 December 1796, Minerve, under the command of Captain George Cockburn, was involved in an action with  against the Spanish frigates Santa Sabina and Ceres. Minerve captured the Santa Sabina, which lost 164 men killed and wounded. Minerve herself lost eight killed, 38 wounded and four missing. Minerve also suffered extensive damage to her masts and rigging. Blanche went off in pursuit of Ceres. Early the next morning a Spanish frigate approached Minerve, which made ready to engage. However, two Spanish ships of the line and two more frigates approached. Skillful sailing enabled Cockburn to escape with Minerve but the Spaniards recaptured Santa Sabina and her prize crew.

On the evening of 1 August 1799, at 9 P.M., Minerves boats came alongside . Captain Francis Austen of Peterel sent these boats and his own to cut out some vessels from the Bay of Diano, near Genoa. Firing was heard at around midnight and by morning the boats returned, bringing with them a large settee carrying wine, and the Virginie, a French warship. Virginie was a Turkish-built half-galley that the French had captured at Malta the year before. She had provision for 26 oars and carried six guns. She was under the command of a lieutenant de vaisseau and had a crew of 36 men, 20 of whom had jumped overboard when the British approached, and 16 of whom the British captured. She had brought General Joubert from Toulon and was going on the next day to Genoa where Joubert was to replace General Moreau in command of the French army in Italy.

Then on 8 November, Minerve and the hired armed brig  captured Mouche.

On 15 May 1800, Minerve and the schooner  captured the French privateer cutter Vengeance. Vengeance was armed with 15 guns and had a crew of 132 men.

In September 1801 Minerve was in the Mediterranean protecting Elba. Early on 2 September Minerve alerted , which was anchored off Piombino, to the presence of two French frigates nearby. Phoenix and Minerve set out in pursuit and  soon came up and joined them. Pomone re-captured , a former British 32-gun fifth-rate frigate now under the command of Monsieur Britel. (The French had captured Success in February, off Toulon.) Minerve also ran onshore the 46-gun French frigate , which had a crew of 283 men under the command of Monsieur Dordelin. Bravoure lost her masts and was totally wrecked; she struck without a shot being fired. Minerve took off a number of prisoners, including Dordelin and his officers, in her boats. With enemy fire from the shore and with night coming on, Captain Cockburn of Minerve decided to halt the evacuation of prisoners; he therefore was unwilling to set Bravoure on fire because some of her crew remained on board.

Napoleonic Wars
Shortly after war with France had resumed Minerve was in the Channel and under the command of Captain Jahleel Brenton. On 26 May 1803 she arrested the French exploration ship  and brought her into Portsmouth, even though Naturaliste was flying a cartel flag and had passports attesting to her non-combatant character. The British released Naturliste and she arrived at Le Havre on 6 June 1803.

In the evening of 2 July, during a fog, Minerve ran aground near Cherbourg. She had been pursuing some merchant vessels when she hit. The guns of Île Pelée and the gunboats  (Captain Lécolier) and  Captain  Pétrée immediately engaged her. Minerves crew attempted to refloat her, but the fire forced Brenton to surrender at 5:30 in the morning, after she had lost 12 men killed and about 15 men wounded.

Brenton attributed his defeat to fire from Fort Liberté at Île Pelée, although the artillery of the fort comprised only three pieces (its other guns had been moved to the fort on the Îles Saint-Marcouf), fired at extreme range, and had ceased fire during the night; on the other hand, the gunboats fired continuously at half-range.

The French took Minerve back into their service under the name Canonnière.

French service as Canonnière

In 1806, under Captain César-Joseph Bourayne, she sailed to Isle de France (now Mauritius) to reinforce the frigate squadron under admiral Linois. Failing to find Linois at Isle de France, Canonnière patrolled the Indian Ocean in the hope of making her junction. She fought an inconclusive action on 21 April against the 74-gun  and the 50-gun .

In late 1806, Canonnière was in Manilla, where Bourayne agreed to sail to Acapulco to claim funds on behalf of the Spanish colonies. She arrived at Acapulco in April 1807 and escorted Spanish merchantmen to Luzon. She then returned to Acapulco on 20 July to load three million piastres, ferried them to Manilla, and was back in Isle de France in July 1808.

The island was blockaded by the 30-gun , under Captain John Woolcombe. On 11 September, Canonnière set sail to meet Laurel and force her to retreat or fight. After a day of searching, Canonnière found Laurel and the frigates began exchanging fire around 17:00. Laurel sustained heavy damage to her rigging, hindering her ability to manoeuvers and at 19:00, a gust of wind gave advantage to Canonnière. Laurel struck her colours shortly before 20:00, and Canonnière took her prize in tow back to Port Louis. Her capture strengthened the situation of the island, as Laurel was freshly arrived, provisioned for a five-month cruise, and carried various supplies for the British squadron.

Canonnière returned to Mauritius in late March 1809 . As she required repairs beyond those possible in Mauritius, the French sold her in June and she eventually sent off for France en flûte under the name Confiance.

Capture and British service as HMS Confiance

It was during this transit that , under Captain John Bligh, recaptured her on 3 February 1810 near Belle Île after a six-hour chase. She was armed with only 14 guns and had a crew of 135 men, under the command of Captain Jacques François Perroud. She had been 93 days in transit when she was captured, having eluded British vessels 14 times. She was carrying goods worth £150,000, General Decaen having made her available to the merchants of Île de France to carry home their merchandise. Amongst her passengers was César-Joseph Bourayne.

Confiance then briefly re-entered the Royal Navy as HMS Confiance. She never returned to active service however, and was deleted from navy lists in 1814.

Citations and references

Citations

References

External links
 
 
 

Frigates of the Royal Navy
Age of Sail frigates of France
1794 ships
Frigates of the French Navy
Captured ships
Ships built in France
Maritime incidents in 1803
Shipwrecks of France